Carex blanda, the common woodland sedge or eastern woodland sedge, is a sedge native to a wide variety of habitats in the eastern and central United States and Canada.

The stem usually has a staminate (male) spike at the tip, two pistillate (female) spikes closely clustered near it, as well as another pistillate spike lower down. The pistillate spikes have 4 to 36 perigynia each, which develop into seeds (achenes).

Carex blanda is rather common in its native range, and tends to spread aggressively, particularly in disturbed soils.

References

blanda